Bronisław Chromy (June 3, 1925 – October 4, 2017) was a Polish sculptor, medallist, painter, and draughtsman, and a professor at the Academy of Fine Arts in Cracow.

Chromy was a Member of the Polish Academy of Learning. He was born at Leńcze near Lanckorona in 1925, he was educated at the Secondary School of Fine Arts and the Academy of Fine Arts in Cracow, graduating in 1956. He was a student of Xawery Dunikowski.

Works:
 Wawel Dragon statue

References

External links
Bronislaw Chromy Gallery

1925 births
2017 deaths
20th-century Polish painters
20th-century Polish male artists
21st-century Polish painters
21st-century male artists
Polish draughtsmen
Medallists
Recipients of the Gold Medal for Merit to Culture – Gloria Artis
Knights of the Order of Polonia Restituta
Officers of the Order of Polonia Restituta
20th-century Polish sculptors
Polish male sculptors
People from Wadowice County
Polish male painters